Canada has a large and well-developed railway system that primarily transports freight. There are two major publicly traded transcontinental freight railway systems, Canadian National (CN) and Canadian Pacific (CP). Nationwide passenger services are provided by the federal crown corporation Via Rail, and three international services to the US by Amtrak. Three Canadian cities have commuter train services: in the Montreal area by Exo, in the Toronto area by GO Transit, and in the Vancouver area by West Coast Express. These cities and several others are also served by light rail or metro systems. Only one (Toronto) has an extensive streetcar (tram) system. Smaller railways such as Ontario Northland Railway also run passenger trains to remote rural areas.  The Rocky Mountaineer and Royal Canadian Pacific provide luxury rail tours for viewing scenery in the Canadian Rockies as well as other mountainous areas of British Columbia and Alberta.

Canada has  total trackage, of which only  is electrified (all urban rail transit networks). Canada uses  standard gauge track for the majority of its railway system.

History

The first Canadian railway, the Champlain and Saint Lawrence Railroad, was opened outside Montreal in 1836. This led to rapid expansion of railways in the Canadas, sometimes excessive growth as uneconomic lines were built since the government guaranteed profits.

This proved disastrous for government finances, however, and the Canadas were all but bankrupted by the subsidies. The largest rail project of this period was also a disaster. The Grand Trunk Railway linking Montreal to Sarnia was finished in 1860, but was vastly mired in debt. In exchange for bailing out the company the government escaped its guarantee on the railway bonds.

Canadian confederation was made possible in part by the railways. The separate colonial governments had all but emptied their treasuries building railways, and a new and more stable method of financing them was required. It was also believed that union would allow for the needed construction of railways linking British North America. The Maritimes joined only because of promises to build the Intercolonial Railway, and British Columbia only because of a promise to build a transcontinental railway.

The government had learned its lesson, and these railways were not funded by guarantees. Rather, the construction of the Intercolonial was fully controlled by the government under the direction of Sir Sanford Fleming.

The railway to the Pacific, the Canadian Pacific, was financed by private funds and through massive land grants in the Canadian prairies (much of it of little value until the railway arrived), $25 million in cash and a guaranteed monopoly. The railway, an engineering marvel that was then the longest in the world, was completed in 1885 to great fanfare.

The booming Canadian economy after 1900 led to plans to build two new transcontinental railways. The Canadian Northern, a successful system covering the northern part of the prairies, and the Grand Trunk (through its Grand Trunk Pacific subsidiary) both launched ambitious plans to expand. The government at first encouraged the two to come to some arrangement and build only one new network, but in the end no agreement was made and the government supported the expansion of both systems. The federal government itself built the National Transcontinental, a line from Moncton, New Brunswick, through Quebec City to Winnipeg, passing through the vast and uninhabited hinterland of the Canadian Shield.

This aggressive expansion proved disastrous when immigration and supplies of capital all but disappeared with the outbreak of the First World War. The Canadian Northern, Grand Trunk Pacific, and Grand Trunk were nationalized by the federal government, which absorbed the debt of over two billion dollars. All three railways, along with the Canadian Government Railways (formed by the Intercolonial, National Transcontinental, and several smaller lines) were then merged into the Canadian National Railways between 1918 and 1923.

The years after the First World War saw only moderate expansion of the rail network and the age of the great railways were over in Canada. The automobile provided strong competition by the 1920s, and after the Second World War most passengers were lost to automobiles and airlines. During the post-war period several large resource lines were opened in Quebec, Labrador, and British Columbia – several of which are not directly connected to the main North American network.

In 1978 the government created Via Rail which took over all national passenger service in the country. In 1987 the National Transportation Act partially deregulated the railway industry in Canada and removed much of the red tape that railways experienced when attempting to abandon unprofitable lines; however, the NTA is now viewed as more of a failure in that railways used the legislation merely as a first-resort after "demarketing" a line, rather than a last-resort after trying to find a short line buyer. In November 1995 the federal government privatized CN, and in 1996, the government corrected the NTA 1987 shortfalls with the Canadian Transportation Act which more fully deregulates the railway industry.

Regulatory environment

While the federal government legislates, and regulates through such bodies as Transport Canada, the railways, various provinces have their own legislation, and indeed if the railway is contained exclusively within the province, are governed by it unless the federal government declares it of importance to the entire country.  The Railway Association of Canada, a lobby group, provides helpful lists of legislation, regulation, orders, and 
circulars on its website.

List of Canadian railway operators

The Canadian Transportation Agency maintains a list, with status updates, of federal railway operators.  This list is somewhat opaque, because certain owners set up operations in the names of holding companies. This list includes:

 Canadian National Railway
 Canadian Pacific Railway
 Hudson Bay Railway Co.
 Quebec North Shore and Labrador Railway
 RailLink Canada
 Tshiuetin Rail Transportation
 Via Rail

Provincial and regional railways include:
 Ontario Northland Railway
New Brunswick Southern Railway
 Metrolinx
In addition, several U.S. operators connect to the Canadian network:

 BNSF Railway
 CSX Transportation
 Norfolk Southern
 Union Pacific

Rail link(s) with adjacent countries
  United States – same gauge

See also

 Alaska-Alberta Railway Development Corporation
 Algoma Central Railway
 BC Rail
 Central Manitoba Railway
 High-speed rail in Canada
 Hudson Bay Railway (1910)
 Island Rail Corridor
 List of Canadian railways
 List of defunct Canadian railways
 Track gauge in Canada
 White Pass and Yukon Route

References 

 Darling H., The Politics of Freight Rates McClelland and Stewart 1980
 Due J. F. The Intercity Electric Railway Industry in Canada University of Toronto Press 1966
 Eagle J. A., The Canadian Pacific Railway and the Development of Western Canada, 1896–1914. McGill-Queen's University Press 1989
 R. B. Fleming; The Railway King of Canada: Sir William Mackenzie, 1849–1923 University of British Columbia Press, 1991
 D. W. Hertel; History of the Brotherhood of Maintenance of Way Employees: Its Birth and Growth, 1887–1955. 1955
 Harold. A. Innis, and A. R. M. Lower; Select Documents in Canadian Economic History, 1783–1885 University of Toronto Press, 1933
 Frank Leonard; A Thousand Blunders: The Grand Trunk Pacific Railway and Northern British Columbia University of British Columbia Press, 1996
 A.A. den Otter. The Philosophy of Railways: The Transcontinental Railway Idea in British North America University of Toronto Press, 1997.
 Regehr, T. D. The Canadian Northern Railway Macmillan of Canada 1976
 Stevens, G. History of the Canadian National Railways Macmillan Company 1973
 R. Kent Weaver; The Politics of Industrial Change: Railway Policy in North America The Brookings Institution, 1985
 Beckles Willson; The Life of Lord Strathcona and Mount Royal 1915.

External links

Forging the National Dream — Illustrated Historical Essay
History of Rail in Canada
Train travel in Canada